Asthenotricha fernandi is a moth in the family Geometridae first described by Louis Beethoven Prout in 1935. It is found in Bioko, an Atlantic Ocean island that is part of Equatorial Guinea.

References

Moths described in 1935
Asthenotricha
Moths of Africa